Lieutenant General Richard John Cripwell,  (born 1962) is a former senior British Army officer. He has served as the Lieutenant Governor of Guernsey since 2022.

Early life and education
Cripwell was born in 1962 in Newry, Northern Ireland. He was educated in Dublin, Ireland, and at Welbeck College.

Military career
Cripwell was commissioned into the Royal Engineers in 1982. He became commanding officer of 26 Engineer Regiment and then served as commander of the Intelligence, Surveillance and Reconnaissance Task Force in Kosovo. He went on to be Assistant Chief of Staff at Permanent Joint Headquarters in January 2010, Director Strategic Transition and Assessments Group at the Headquarters of the International Security Assistance Force in February 2012 and Commander British Forces Cyprus and Administrator of the Sovereign Base Areas in January 2013. After that he became Head of the British Defence Staff and Defence Attaché in Washington, D.C. in March 2015. In the 2017 New Year Honours, Cripwell was appointed Companion of the Order of the Bath, and in October he became the Deputy Commander of NATO's Resolute Support Mission. Cripwell assumed the appointment of Deputy Commander NATO Allied Land Command on 22 February 2019.

On 8 September 2021, it was announced that Cripwell had been appointed as the new Lieutenant Governor of Guernsey. He was sworn in on 15 February 2022, and retired from the British Army on 29 April 2022.

References

|-

|-

British Army lieutenant generals
British military attachés
British Army personnel of the Iraq War
British Army personnel of the War in Afghanistan (2001–2021)
British military personnel of The Troubles (Northern Ireland)
Commanders of the Order of the British Empire
Living people
Officers of the Legion of Merit
Companions of the Order of the Bath
Military personnel from Newry
1962 births
Royal Engineers officers
People educated at Welbeck Defence Sixth Form College